Double Arch may refer to:

 Double Arch (Kentucky), a pair of natural arches in Daniel Boone National Forest, Kentucky, United States.
 Double Arch (Utah),  a famous close-set pair of natural arches in Arches National Park, Utah, United States.
 Double aortic arch, a relatively rare congenital cardiovascular malformation
 Double arch bridge, a bridge with abutments at each end and in the middle shaped as two curved arches